Woodville Historic District in Woodville, Mississippi is a historic district listed on the National Register of Historic Places. It was initially listed in 1982 and expanded on three later occasions. It includes Office and Banking House of West Feliciana Railroad and it may include Rosemont (Woodville, Mississippi), both of which are separately listed on the NRHP.

References

Queen Anne architecture in Mississippi
Federal architecture in Mississippi
Historic districts on the National Register of Historic Places in Mississippi
Neoclassical architecture in Mississippi
Geography of Wilkinson County, Mississippi
National Register of Historic Places in Wilkinson County, Mississippi